Wireless Session Protocol (WSP) is an open standard for maintaining high level session. Wireless session that starts when the user connects to one URL and ends when the user leaves that URL. The session wide properties are defined once at the beginning of the session, which has the benefit of saving bandwidth due to the nature of wireless communication. The session establishing process does not have long connection algorithms. 

WSP is based on HTTP 1.1 with few enhancements. WSP provides the upper-level application layer of WAP with a consistent interface for two session services. The first is a connection-oriented service that operates above a transaction layer protocol WTP and the
second is a connection less service that operates above a secure or non-secure datagram transport service. Therefore, WSP exists for two reasons. First, in the connection-mode it enhances the HTTP 1.1's performance over wireless environment. Second, it provides a session layer so the whole WAP environment resembles ISO OSI Reference Model.

References

External links
Open Mobile Alliance
WSP on the Wireshark Wiki

Open Mobile Alliance standards
Session layer protocols
Wireless Application Protocol